Saint-Michel-des-Saints (Marina Le Nautique) Water Aerodrome  is located on Taureau Reservoir,  west of Saint-Michel-des-Saints, Quebec, Canada.

References

Airports in Lanaudière
Seaplane bases in Quebec